Aonides trifida is a bristle worm from the Spionidae family. Aonides trifida has a pointed head, two pairs of eyes and grows up to 100mm in length. Aonides trifida is a surface deposit feeder and bioturbator which tolerates a sediment mud content up to 80%, but has an optimum range of 0-5%.

References 

Canalipalpata